Jerry Costello (born February 13, 1969) is a former member of the Illinois House of Representatives, who represented the 116th district from his appointment in July 2011 to succeed Dan Reitz until his resignation in May 2019. He is a member of the Democratic Party. The 116th district includes all or parts of Cahokia, Chester, Columbia, Dupo, East Carondelet, East St. Louis, Red Bud, Smithton, Sparta and Waterloo.

He is the son of former U.S. Representative Jerry Costello, whose district overlapped his son's. In 2018, Jerry Costello Jr. was named by J.B. Pritzker a member of the Prtizker's Agriculture Transition Committee. On May 7, 2019, Costello resigned from the Illinois House of Representatives to take the position of Director of Law Enforcement at the Illinois Department of Natural Resources. He was succeeded by Steeleville Village Trustee Nathan Reitz.

On February 28, 2020, Governor Pritzker announced his appointment of Costello to serve as the Director of the Illinois Department of Agriculture. On April 20, 2021, Costello was confirmed by the Illinois Senate.

References

External links
Representative Jerry F. Costello, II (D) 116th District at the Illinois General Assembly
By session: 98th, 97th
 
Jerry F. Costello at Illinois House Democrats

Democratic Party members of the Illinois House of Representatives
Living people
State cabinet secretaries of Illinois
People from Belleville, Illinois
People from St. Clair County, Illinois
1969 births
Southern Illinois University alumni
American municipal police officers
21st-century American politicians